Mimapatelarthron is a genus of longhorn beetles of the subfamily Lamiinae, containing the following species:

 Mimapatelarthron albonotatum Breuning, 1940
 Mimapatelarthron javanicum Breuning, 1940
 Mimapatelarthron laosense Breuning, 1968

References

Desmiphorini